Wrightoporia is a genus of fungi in the family Bondarzewiaceae. According to a 2008 estimate, the widely distributed genus contains 23 species. The genus was circumscribed by Zdeněk Pouzar in Ceská Mykol. vol.20 on page 173 in 1966.

The genus name of Wrightoporia is in honour of Jorge Eduardo Wright (1922–2005), who was a Argentinian mycologist.

Species
As accepted by Species Fungorum;

Wrightoporia afrocinnamomea 
Wrightoporia araucariae 
Wrightoporia austrosinensis 
Wrightoporia avellanea 
Wrightoporia borealis 
Wrightoporia brunneo-ochracea 
Wrightoporia cinnamomea 
Wrightoporia cremea 
Wrightoporia cremella 
Wrightoporia deviata 
Wrightoporia dimidiata 
Wrightoporia flava 
Wrightoporia gloeocystidiata 
Wrightoporia grandipora 
Wrightoporia iobapha 
Wrightoporia lenta 
Wrightoporia luteola 
Wrightoporia micropora 
Wrightoporia microporella 
Wrightoporia nigrolimitata 
Wrightoporia novae-zelandiae 
Wrightoporia ochrocrocea 
Wrightoporia palmicola 
Wrightoporia perplexa 
Wrightoporia porilacerata  – Brazil
Wrightoporia pouzarii 
Wrightoporia radicata 
Wrightoporia subavellanea  – China
Wrightoporia subrutilans 
Wrightoporia trametoides 
Wrightoporia trimitica 
Wrightoporia unguliformis  – China

Former species;
 W. africana  = Pseudowrightoporia africana, Hericiaceae family
 W. aurantiporaa  = Pseudowrightoporia aurantipora, Hericiaceae
 W. biennisa  = Wrightoporiopsis biennis, Hericiaceae
 W. braceia  = Amylosporus bracei, Bondarzewiaceae
 W. campbelliia  = Amylosporus campbellii, Bondarzewiaceae
 W. casuarinicolaa  = Amylosporus casuarinicola, Bondarzewiaceae
 W. cinnamomeaa  = Wrightoporia afrocinnamomea
 W. cylindrosporaa  = Pseudowrightoporia cylindrospora, Hericiaceae
 W. efibulataa  = Amylosporus efibulatus, Bondarzewiaceae
 W. gillesiia  = Pseudowrightoporia gillesii, Hericiaceae
 W. gyroporaa  = Amylonotus gyroporus, Bondarzewiaceae
 W. isabellinaa  = Stecchericium isabellinum, Bondarzewiaceae
 W. japonicaa  = Pseudowrightoporia japonica, Hericiaceae
 W. labyrinthinaa  = Amylonotus labyrinthinus, Bondarzewiaceae
 W. microporaa  = Wrightoporia microporella
 W. ramosaa  = Amylonotus ramosus, Bondarzewiaceae
 W. roseocontextaa  = Wrightoporiopsis roseocontexta, Hericiaceae
 W. rubellaa  = Amylosporus rubellus, Bondarzewiaceae
 W. solomonensisa  = Pseudowrightoporia solomonensis, Hericiaceae
 W. stramineaa  = Pseudowrightoporia straminea, Hericiaceae
 W. subadustaa  = Murinicarpus subadustus, Polyporaceae
 W. neotropicaa  = Wrightoporiopsis neotropica, Hericiaceae
 W. tenuisa  = Amylonotus tenuis, Bondarzewiaceae
 W. tropicalisa  = Larssoniporia tropicalis, Echinodontiaceae

References

Russulales
Russulales genera